Admiral Iftikhar Ahmed Sirohey  (b. 1934) is a retired four-star rank admiral, strategist, and a memoirist who is currently tenuring his fellowship at the Institute of Strategic Studies (ISS) in Islamabad, Pakistan.

Admiral Sirohey previously tenured as the Chief of Naval Staff (CNS) of Pakistan Navy from 1986 to 1988, and later ascended as the 6th Chairman of the Joint Chiefs of Staff Committee from 1988 until retiring in 1991. He is only the second four-star admiral in the Navy's history to be appointed as Chairman Joint Chiefs.

After his retirement, he joined the academia after accepting to be inducted in the faculty of the Sustainable Development Policy Institute and currently working as a strategist for the Institute of Strategic Studies. He also author his autobiography, Truth Never Retires, in 1996 which was published by the Jang Publishers in Lahore.

Biography

Early life and education

Iftikhar Ahmed Sirohey was born in Karnal, a small town, in East Punjab, British India, in 1934. He hailed from a Punjabi family who were the local farmers in Karnal in East Punjab who moved to Muslim-majority West Punjab in 1940.

The family later moved to Karachi after the independence of Pakistan in 1947. After graduating from a local high school in Karachi, he joined the Karachi University to study electronics but saw the Navy's advertisement and decided to write to Ministry of Defence in a view to join the Navy. He left the Karachi University in 1951 when he was commissioned in the Navy as Midshipman and did his initial military training at the Pakistan Military Academy before being sent to United Kingdom in 1952.

He was educated at the Royal Naval College at Greenwich in England where he did specialised in signals/navigation and gained electrical engineering course degree before returning to Pakistan in 1956. Upon returning to Pakistan, he was promoted as Sub-Lieutenant in the Navy and formally inducted in the Engineering Branch.

In 1981, he was directed to attend the course on defence studies at the National Defence University where he attained master's degree on defense analysis in 1983.

Staff and war appointments

In 1958, Lt. Sirohey joined PNS Badr as its Executive officer, along with Lieutenant Iqbal F. Quadir, signals officer. He served on this assignment until 1960 when he was appointed aide-de-camp to Cdre M. Hassan, the Commander Karachi (COMKAR).  In 1961–63, he served on PNS Khaibar on various command assignment. From 1963 to 1964, Lt. Sirohey acted as military advisor to Imperial Iranian Navy (IIN) in a programme funded by the United Kingdom.

In 1964, he was promoted as Lieutenant-Commander in the Navy, and participated in the second war with India in 1965. Lt.Cdr. Sirohey participated in the naval bombardment of Dwarka air station and acted as second-in-command (S-in-C) of PNS Alamgir commanded by Cdr Iqbal F. Quadir. Upon returning, he was appointed to command the PNS Tughril shortly after the war but the appointment was short lived.

In 1966–69, Lt.Cdr. Sirohey performed his duties as an aide-de-camp to then-Navy Commander-in-Chief Vice-Admiral Syed Mohammad Ahsan.

In 1970, he was posted in East Pakistan as military adviser to East Pakistan Rifles but later directed to United Kingdom for a diplomatic/defence assignment. He returned to Pakistan on 15 November 1971, and was made commanding officer of the PNS Alamgir in the 25th Destroyer Squadron during the war.

After the war, he was promoted as Commander and served as Naval Secretary at the Navy NHQ in Rawalpindi to the Chief of Naval Staff which he remained from 1972 to 1973. In 1973–75, he served as an instructor at the Pakistan Naval Academy in Karachi and served in the faculty of training until being promoted as Captain. In 1975–76, Capt. Sirohey was appointed as military attaché and served in the High Commission of Pakistan in London, United Kingdom.

Upon returning to Pakistan in 1976, Capt. Sirohey was appointed to serve as a Director of Naval Warfare and Operations (DNWO) under COMKAR which he served until 1978. During this time, he made pioneering efforts on gaining knowledge on Soviet developed Styx missile acquired by the Egyptian Navy. In 1977–79, he was posted in Naval Intelligence and promoted as Commodore in the Navy. Cdre Sirohey later directed to attend the National Defence University in Pakistan. From 1980 to 1983, he served as ACNS (Technical) and later elevated as the DCNS (Personnel) at the Navy NHQ.

In 1983, he was promoted to two-star rank, Rear-Admiral, and assumed his duties as Commander Karachi coast (COMKAR). In 1984, he was appointed as Commander Pakistan Fleet and promoted as Vice-Admiral in the Navy. In 1985, Vice-Admiral Sirohey was appointed as VCNS under Chief of Naval Staff Admiral Tariq Kamal Khan.

Chief of Naval Staff

On 8 April 1986, President Zia-ul-Haq announced to appoint Vice-Admiral Sirohey as a four star rank admiral and as the new Chief of Naval Staff in a place of retiring Admiral Tariq Kamal Khan. On 9 April 1986, Admiral Sirohey took over the command of the Navy from Admiral TK Khan. Before his four-star appointment was confirmed, he was in race with Vice-Admiral Ahmad Zamir who was initially appointed for the post but suddenly died of a heart attack before Vice-Admiral Zamir was notified about the promotion.

He was the most senior admiral in the Navy; therefore, he superseded no one in the Navy. His tenure as naval chief saw the enhancement of Navy in terms of both manpower and military procurement from the United States.

As naval chief, Admiral Sirohey entered in complicated and expensive military procurement deal with the United States Navy in 1986. For that purpose in 1987, he went and visited United States and Pentagon to hold defence procurement talks with the United States military.

In 1987, the United States agreed on transferring of eight Brooke-Garcia class surface warships and repair ship to the Pakistan Navy on a five-year lease under a Foreign Military Sales programme in 1988. Admiral Sirohey also oversaw the introduction of installing imported Harpoon missiles on its frigates as early as 1988. He also engaged in procuring the P-3C Orion aircraft for Navy but they weren't delivered until 1996. In 1988, he also visited China to strengthened military ties with China and Pakistan.

Admiral Sirohey had backed decision of General Mirza Aslam Beg, the Chief of Army Staff, to restore the democratic rule after the death and state of President Zia-ul-Haq in 1988. He endorsed Chairman Senate Ghulam Ishaq Khan's bid for Acting President and witnessed the general elections held in 1988 that saw Benazir Bhutto becoming the Prime Minister while forming the government in 1988.

Chairman Joint Chiefs
In 1988, Prime Minister Benazir Bhutto appointed Admiral Sirohey as the next Chairman Joint Chiefs of Staff Committee to fill the vacancy caused by the death of General Akhtar Abdur-Rahman. Admiral Sirohey was the most senior four-star officer in the military and supersedes no one.

At the military science circles, Admiral Sirohey was said to be fascinated with the latest technology made him look at the possibilities of procuring a nuclear submarine from China to counter India's acquisition Charlie-class nuclear submarine. On multiple occasions, Admiral Sirohey lobbied for procuring the nuclear submarine from China on a short-term lease and had been a strongly advised for maintaining a strong nuclear deterrence. As Chairman joint chiefs, Admiral Sirohey consolidated the nuclear arsenals development under the patronage of Joint Chiefs of Staff Committee as its policy enforcement institution while tightening the security around the program. In 1988, he worked with Prime Minister Benazir Bhutto on reaching with an agreement with India to exchange information on each other's nuclear facilities to avoid unintentional accidents and contingency plans to attack each other's facilities.

In 1989, he held meetings with Brigadier-General Ali Shamkhani, the Commander of the Iranian Revolution Guard, to hold talks on mutual defence interests. However, it was recently revealed by historian that Shamkhani directly demanded the "hand over of the nuclear bombs" as part of the promised made by former president. Upon hearing this demands, Admiral Sirohey demurred and General Shamkhani became irate. However, the claim of this meeting cannot be verified as Razaei later confessed that Admiral Sirohey did not recall the meeting "or ever hearing about a deal to sell nuclear weapons to Iran."

Admiral Sirohey, acting as military adviser to Prime Minister Benazir Bhutto and President Ghulam Ishaq Khan, supported the government's decision to support the Soviet Union's withdrawal from Afghanistan in 1989. After Prime Minister Benazir Bhutto paid her first state visit to the United States, Admiral Sirohey caught between the political rivalry between President Ghulam Ishaq and Prime Minister Benazir. In 1989, Prime Minister Benazir Bhutto controversially signed retirement papers and relieved him from the command of the military in order to bring up army chief General Beg in his place. This move was seen as a political move and Benazir Bhutto's attempt to control the military through army and loyalist officers and was said to be a direct attack on military by the political leader.

The retirement papers were deemed null and ineffective when President Ghulam Ishaq confirmed that Admiral Sirohey completing his term until 1991 and handled the matters very efficiently. After the matter became public, Chairman joint chief Admiral Sirohey and army chief General Beg fell out with Prime Minister Benazir Bhutto as both suspected that the Prime Minister wanted to get rid of them. Admiral Sirohey became supportive of President Ghulam Ishaq dismissal of Prime Minister Benazir Bhutto in 1990, and witnessed the inauguration of Nawaz Sharif becoming the prime minister.

In 1990, Admiral Sirohey arranged and held state dinner for United States Central Command's commander General Norman Schwarzkopf where, together with army chief General Beg, brief the USCENTCOM on Pakistan Armed Forces battle preparations and military operational capabilities of Pakistan armed forces in Saudi contingent.

Retirement

On 8 November 1991, Prime Minister Nawaz Sharif nominated General Shamim Alam as the next Chairman Joint Chiefs of Staff Committee and was confirmed by President Ghulam Ishaq.

On 9 November 1991, Admiral Sirohey retired from his forty-year long military service when his term as chairman ended and was given a guard of honour by General Shamim Alam. Following his retirement, he also founded the Foundation for the Advancement of Engineering Sciences and Advanced Technologies— a think tank dedicated for promoting science and technology in the country where he is its Chief Executive.

In 1992, one year into his retirement, Sirohey joined Sustainable Development Policy Institute and later affiliated himself with The Institute of Strategic Studies in 1995 which he currently works there as a strategist. He is also the author of his autobiography, Truth Never Retires (1996) Jang Publishers, Lahore.

Personal life
Sirohey is married, and has four sons, Saad, Asad, Samad & Fahd.

Awards and decorations

Foreign decorations

External links
 Official website of Pakistan Navy

References

|-

1934 births
Living people
Punjabi people
Muhajir people
University of Karachi alumni
Graduates of the Royal Naval College, Greenwich
Pakistani military engineers
Pakistani electrical engineers
Pakistani military personnel of the Indo-Pakistani War of 1971
Pakistan Navy admirals
National Defence University, Pakistan alumni
Chiefs of Naval Staff (Pakistan)
People of the Soviet–Afghan War
R
Military government of Pakistan (1977–1988)
Chairmen Joint Chiefs of Staff Committee
Pakistani chief executives
Pakistani military writers
Pakistani autobiographers
Pakistani memoirists
Defence and security analysts in Pakistan
Pakistani military attachés